Michael Kenyon (1931–2005) was a British author.

Michael Kenyon may also refer to:

Michael H. Kenyon (born 1945), criminal
Michael Kenyon (Canadian writer)
Michael Kenyon, a character in the 1954 film Forbidden Cargo